Malek National Museum and Library is a museum and national library in Tehran, Iran. Malek National Library and Museum Institution (MNLMI) is the first private museum of Iran, and one of the 6 large libraries holding the exquisite manuscripts. The MNLMI collection is a rich trove of the best manuscripts and Iranian historical artworks. The Institution is located in the historical precinct of “Bagh-e Melli”, that is considered the cultural-historical center of Tehran. Usually, the MNLM visitors are numerous university students and researchers, as well as tourists who enjoy its library and museum facilities. It is one of the biggest libraries of precious manuscripts in Iran, built by Hadji Hussein Agha Malek, the richest man in Iran at the time. He built it in a traditional Persian architecture style. One of the biggest contributors is Esat Malek Malek, Hadji Hussein Agha Malek's eldest daughter, who contributed to the museum's development.

Haj Hossein Aqa Malek 
Haj Hossein Aqa Malek (1871-1972), the founder and donor of MNLM was born and died in Tehran. Both his grandfather and father were among the greatest merchants in Iran during the past two centuries. Haj Hossein’s father, Haj Mohammad Kazem Malek-ol-Tojjar, left him a large inheritance after his death, including a lot of properties and gardens in Tehran and Khorasan Province. While traveling to Mashhad (the capital of Khorasan Province at that time) to manage the family’s assets, young Hossein got familiar with some Iranian-Islamic artworks, including a fine manuscript. This experience laid the ground for the establishment of an exquisite library and museum in coming decades. In 1908, Haj Hossein Aqa Malek founded a big library in Mashhad, which consisted of both old manuscripts and printed books. Later on, he moved the library to his historical house located in the area of Tehran Grand Bazaar, and thus provided a free-of-charge access for the interested scholars. While collecting the manuscripts, Haj Malek bought a valuable collection of historical artworks that led into the establishment of the first private museum in the history of Iran. In 1937, he donated his invaluable library and museum to Astan-e Qods-e Razavi, as the greatest religious and cultural institution in Iran, with the aim to be visited and used by the public during and after his lifetime. He also donated many of his properties in Tehran and Khorasan for charity and public affairs, so he was known as the greatest donor of the contemporary history of Iran. Among his other charitable acts, he granted more than 2.5 million square meters of land to build houses for the teachers and the employees of the Ministries of Health and Post in Khorasan Province; donated Vakil-Abad’s 480-hectares garden to the people of Mashhad for the purpose of converting it to a public park; contributed the garden of Malek Palace in Shahr-e Ray for building a school; and endowed more than 60,000 hectares of properties, including farmlands, gardens, and animal husbandries to Astan-e Qods-e Razavi. According to the MNLM deed of endowment, Haj Hossein Aqa Malek had stipulated that MNLM is a non-profit institution aimed at expanding the knowledge among the people. He has also mentioned that his collection would be available to both Iranian and foreign addressees.

Malek National Library and Museum: A Treasure of the Best Historical Artworks 
Besides the printed books and historical periodical documents, Malek National Library possesses 19000 rare and exquisite manuscripts that provide a very good resource for many scholars and students. Malek National Museum also consists of a collection of precious artworks of the Iranian history - since the first millennium B.C. to the present day, that is classified as follows:

1- The collection of artworks, including the paintings, by famous Iranian artists such as Kamal-ol-Molk, miniature paintings, illuminated manuscripts, and some works by European painters.

2- The lacquer art collection, containing pen boxes, book covers, and mirror-cases decorated with lacquer paintings.

3- The historical coins collection, consisting of about 9000 pieces of coins and Iranian medals minted since the first millennium B.C. to the present day.

4- The collection of 100,000 postage stamps, including the first stamps printed in Iran, and the ones printed abroad.

5- The collection of artworks donated by lady Ezzat-Malek Malek, the daughter of Haj Hossein Aqa Malek, composed of Qajar paintings, manuscripts, documents, pen boxes, hookah bowls, as well as lacquer works.

6- The calligraphy collection, that embraced the artworks of the greatest and well-known Iranian and Islamic artists.

7- The collection of decorating arts, including carpets, rugs, vases, chandeliers, and furniture

8- The collection of Haj Hossein Aqa Malek’s personal belongings, including his artworks, writings, and portraits, displayed in the exclusive Exhibition Room of Haj Hossein Aqa Malek

9- The gallery of periodic exhibitions, held regularly on traditional Iranian Islamic arts.

The facilities and attractions of MNLM 
In 1996, the Malek National Library and Museum was moved from Malek’s historical house, located in the area of Tehran Grand Bazaar, to its present building in the historical precinct of Bagh-e Melli. The six-story new building has been structured based on the Islamic architecture and arts. MNLM has a unique location, for it is situated in the cultural-historical center of Iran’s capital city, next to the Meidan-e Mashq (a place for military activities left since Qajar period) historical portal.

MNLM outstanding neighboring buildings include the Ministry of Foreign Affairs, and a collection of museums, such as the National Museum of Iran (Iran-e Bastan), Sepah Bank Coin Museum, Ebrat Museum (formerly a prison), Iran Science and Technology Museum, Post Museum, Glassware and Ceramic Museum of Iran (Abgineh Museum), and Iran Customs’ Museum and Historical Documents Center. 30-Tir Street is one of the ways to access MNLM.

This historical street is well known as the Religions’ Street because of certain buildings located in it, including two churches, a fire temple, as well as a synagogue next to a mosque. Because of its special characteristics, this street is considered as one of the important centers of tourism in Tehran for its daily, domestic, and international visitors. Regarding the urban geography, the existence of Imam Khomeini Central Metro Station, a taxi terminal, as well as two bus terminals located near MNLM, has facilitated the visitors and scholars’ access.

Besides the scholars and university students who enjoy the free-of-charge access to Malek Library facilities, there are also daily individual or group visitors, either Iranians or non-Iranians, who benefit from MNLM treasures. Among the most important activities and programs of the MNLM are conducting periodic and seasonal exhibitions, concerning the traditional medicine, calendar, constellations, and decorative arts, as well as holding meetings and specialized training workshops on traditional Iranian-Islamic arts, such as miniature, calligraphy, lacquer painting, and making marbled papers.

Temporary exhibitions

Exhibition of Sitting: Selective Collection of Malek Library and Museum 

Artworks are not only for capturing figures of men, they are also symbols of social behaviors and life styles, which during the time take different meanings. Sitting, in Iranian culture, has its own poems and proverbs, and each style addresses differently. This exhibition is a narration of sitting, with its proverbs lied with artworks of Malek national library and museum.

Idioms and proverbs on “nešastan” (siting)

Bar sare pāy nešastan: Squatting

Pase zānu nešastan: sorrowful sitting

Kaj nešastan va rāst goftan: an ironical idiom which means being drunk but saying the truth

Do zānu nešastan: a way of sitting which includes leaning the knees under the legs to show the politeness of a subaltern before an elder

Be zānu nešāndan: defeat, vanquish

Bar sare yek pā nešastan: sitting on one leg in a way that the other leg is bent before the belly vertically

Gerdpāy nešastan: crossed-leg sitting

Be zānu nešastan: sitting on the knee, sitting politely

Bast nešastan: staying in the “bast” (“Bast” is a place for the criminals to take refuge in)

Saḥrānešin: Nomad

Majles nešin:the one who is a member of a session or meeting

Bardar nešin: beggars who stay before the houses

Parde nešin: anchorite

Taḵt nešin:a king with the throne

Ḵāk nešin:forlorn and lonely

Ḵarābāt nešin:the one who stays in the tavern

Sajjāde nešin: ascetic

Guše nešin:withdrawn, dissociable, hermit

Masnad nešin: the one who sits on the throne, the one who has the power

Ham nešin: companion

Islamic Schools According to the Manuscript Collection of Malek National Library and Museum 

date : 13 December 2016

At the advent of the Islamic civilization “Ketāb” (the Book) was recognized as the miracle of Muhammad and the prevailing attribute of this civilization. It started to develop and to gain in eminence, and it nurtured in a milieu of the “book”-related findings and phenomena of the ancient civilizations of Greece, Persia, and China. It was first in Bayt al-Hikma (House of Wisdom), that the Greek and Alexandrian codicology and manuscript illumination attracted translators and codicologists. In those early years, with the arrival of Persian secretaries as “scribes” (kātebs) in the Abbasid court, the findings of the dabīrs (scribes) of the Sasanian Iran found its way to the realm of manuscript and codicology, and the scribes (kāteb) found a high and distinguished status.

Aside from the circle of the bureaucrat scribes, however, others were also engaged in writing manuscripts, including warrāqs (paper sellers/booksellers) and the scholars. Besides, the librarians in public or private libraries also were somehow involved in scribing. In more recent periods, apart from the bureaucrat scribes, the calligraphers as well as groups known as modhahheb (gilder), mojalled (binder), talākūb (gold inlay maker), medādsāz (pencil-maker) were each also involved (in a way), in producing the manuscripts, and during the next few centuries, this led to the turning points of scribing in the Iranian and Islamic tradition.

Along with administrative and bureaucratic scribing and copying of manuscripts, the Islamic schools, as another center of scribing, have always played a major role in the survival of the scribing tradition. One of the important features of the manuscripts scribed at the centers of teaching and learning is the corrections mentioned by the tutor, when the tutee read out the text, sometimes written on the margins of the manuscript, and sometimes on separate sheets later added to the book. Aside from the original, these manuscripts are of importance, due to their proximity to the writing form of the author of the work, and their consistency and accuracy of recording. The amount of effort dedicated to the field of scribing and manuscript illumination, on the one hand, and the erudite diligence of scholars and seekers of knowledge, on the other, joined the Islamic “miracle of the book” with the “book-believing civilization”, leaving a legacy called “the manuscript”, which is mostly treasured and cultivating, and worthy to be appreciated and safeguarded. Within the manuscript collection of Malek National Library and Museum Institution, there are numerous manuscripts scribed by the seekers of knowledge and scholars at the centers of learning and teaching. Among these works, one can find instances from all across the Islamic domain of thought and civilization: from Cairo, Damascus, and Diyarbakir to Herat, Samarkand, and Tashkent; from Dār al-Salṭaneh (House of Monarchy) of Rey, Dār al-Molk (House of the State) of Esfahan, and Dār al-Khalāfeh (House of Caliphate) of Tehran, to Qūchān, Abarkūh, and Shūreh village. We are going to watch some of these works together.

Permanent exhibition of stamps

See also
Safir Office Machines Museum
National Library of Iran
Cultural Heritage Organization of Iran
Qajar dynasty
Hadji Hossein Agha Malek
List of museums in Iran

References

External links 

Video on Malek museum 
 
On Ezzat Malek
{http://iranfrontpage.com/news/society/lifestyles/2014/07/iranian-benefactress-ezzat-malek-dies/}
https://www.asia.si.edu/collections/new-acquisitions/soudavar.asp

Libraries in Iran
Culture in Tehran
Museums in Tehran
National museums of Iran
Educational institutions established in 1996
1996 establishments in Iran
Libraries established in 1996